James Pain (1779 – 13 December 1877) was an English architect. Born into a family of English architects, his grandfather was William Pain, his father James Pain and his brother George Richard Pain. James Pain served as an apprentice to the architect John Nash of London.  James and George Richard were commissioned by the Board of First Fruits to design churches and glebe houses in Ireland. In 1833, James Pain became one of the four principal architects of the Board of Ecclesiastical Commissioners. He settled in Limerick, Ireland. Many of his designs were produced in collaboration with his brother George Richard who practised in Cork.

Biography 
Born in England, Pain came to Ireland c. 1811 to supervise the construction of Lough Cutra Castle in Galway. He would remain in Ireland the rest of his life.

Though often assumed to have lived as a bachelor, there is evidence to suggest that Pain was married to a Harriet Henman, who died in April 1834. Pain died on 13 December 1877, aged 97.

Buildings

 The Market House, Mitchelstown
 O'Neill Crowley Bridge (formerly Brunswick Bridge), Cork 
 Saint George's Church, Mitchelstown - now Saint George's Arts and Heritage Centre
 Mitchelstown Castle
 St. James' Church, Mallow, County Cork
 Dromoland Castle, County Clare
 Limerick Gaol
 Athlunkard Bridge
 Strancally Castle, County Waterford
 Pery Square (Tontine terrace), Limerick
 Toll House, Thomond Bridge, Limerick
 St. Michael's Church, Pery Square
 Adare Manor
 Bank of Ireland, O'Connell Street, Limerick
 Clarina Castle
 Blackrock Castle
 St Munchin's Church of Ireland, Limerick
 Limerick Courthouse (alterations)
 Convamore House, Ballyhooly, County Cork
 Castletownroche Church of Ireland Church, County Cork
 Castlehyde Church, Fermoy, County Cork

References

Notes

Sources

External links
 https://web.archive.org/web/20110610100049/http://www.limerick.com/theroyal/thebook/architects.html

Irish architects
English ecclesiastical architects
1877 deaths
1779 births
Irish ecclesiastical architects
Architects of Roman Catholic churches